Wangenbourg-Engenthal (Alsatian: Wàngeburi-Angedààl) is a commune in the Bas-Rhin department in Grand Est in north-eastern France. The commune was established in November 1974 from the former communes Engenthal and Wangenbourg.

The commune is not a single settlement, but rather an administrative unit comprising the following eight mountain hamlets:

 Engenthal-le-Bas
 Engenthal-le-Haut
 Freudeneck
 les Huttes
 Obersteigen
 Schneethal
 Windsbourg
 Wolfsthal

Population

See also
 Communes of the Bas-Rhin department

References

Communes of Bas-Rhin